The Fox Woman is a fantasy novel by American writer Kij Johnson,  published in 1999 by Tor Books. The lead characters are an ambitious human named Kaya no Yoshifuji and a fox woman named Kitsune. The story follows Johnson's Theodore Sturgeon Award-winning story "Fox Magic", and precedes her novel Fudoki in the "Love/War/Death" trilogy.

Reception
Charles de Lint praised The Fox Woman as "a wonderfully evocative and gripping novel".

References

Debut fantasy novels
Debut science fiction novels
Novels by Kij Johnson
1999 American novels
1999 fantasy novels
Books about foxes
Literature featuring anthropomorphic foxes
Novels set in Japan
Tor Books books
1999 debut novels
Japan in non-Japanese culture